Sultans of the South is a Mexican action film from 2007 directed by Alejandro Lozano.

This is the second film by Lozano after Killing Cabos three years earlier. It was made with the same production team and under the same idea of tackling the action genre and refreshing it with a new twist in the Mexican cinema, which had moved away from action movies in the last two decades.

Data
The locations south Sultans were in Buenos Aires.
The advertising slogan was: Stealing $12 million easy. Surviving to spend it, not so much.

Plot
The story begins with a robbery taking place in Mexico City. The band consists of Carlos, Leonardo, Monica and Leserio had agreed to travel to Argentina to launder money. Arriving in Buenos Aires are in a mob war in which someone takes the opportunity to steal the money and have to recover and give to those who wait.

Cast
Tony Dalton as Carlos Sanchez.
Jordi Molla as Leonardo Batiz.
Ana de la Reguera as Monica Silvari.
Silverio Palacios as Leserio Domínguez.
Erick Luis as Mario.
Celso Bugallo as El Tejano

External links 

Mexican crime films
2000s Mexican films